Green Vigo is a South African former rugby union and rugby league footballer who played in the 1970s and 1980s.

Rugby union
Vigo started his career in rugby union, playing for Saldanha Tigers. He also represented the Proteas in their 1972 tour to the United Kingdom, playing as a centre.

Rugby league
In 1973, Vigo switched codes from rugby union to rugby league when he joined the English rugby league club; Wigan. Vigo played 168 first team games for Wigan, scoring 86 tries, before being sold to Swinton in 1980 for a fee of £15,000. Vigo also went on to play for Oldham.

Vigo played  in Wigan's 19–9 victory over Salford in the 1973–74 Lancashire Cup Final during the 1973–74 season at Wilderspool Stadium, Warrington, on Saturday 13 October 1973, and played  in the 13–16 defeat by Workington Town in the 1977–78 Lancashire Cup Final during the 1977–78 season at Wilderspool Stadium, Warrington, on Saturday 29 October 1977.

In August 1976, Vigo scored seven tries in a 37–5 win against St Helens in the Lancashire Cup, a record for most tries scored in a derby match between Wigan and St Helens.

At representative level, he appeared for the Other Nationalities rugby league team while at Wigan.

In June 1978, he was named in the inaugural Open Rugby World XIII.

References

External links
Statistics at rugbyleagueproject.org

South African rugby league players
Wigan Warriors players
Swinton Lions players
Oldham R.L.F.C. players
Rugby league wingers
Other Nationalities rugby league team players
Possibly living people
Year of birth missing